John Pål Inderberg (born 6 August 1950 Steinkjer, Norway) is a versatile saxophonist and one of the leading traditional musicians in Norway. His playing synthethises many different styles, not least when in partnership with Norwegian and American jazz musicians - players as contrasting as Gil Evans and Lee Konitz.

Career 
As an earlier member of the new cool quartet, Inderberg gave new popularity to the collective art of improvisation in the 1950s. Inderberg's soprano and baritone sax can be heard on a wide range of recordings. 
He has toured and recorded with Lee Konitz and Warne Marsh (saxophone), Chet Baker (trumpet), Bob Brookmeyer (trombone), as well as Siri Gellein and Henning Sommerro. 
He was previously member of Gil Evans' Scandinavian ensemble and has put his mark on several recordings with poet Jan Erik Vold.

Inderberg is a member of the EBU-band in 1980 and 1998. Besides his performing career, he holds the post Teacher of Improvisation and joint head of the jazz department at the Trondheim Musikkonservatorium, NTNU. He has received the Norwegian Jazz Forum award in 1991, known as the Buddy statuette. He was also awarded the Lindemanprisen 2010.

Honors 
1990: Buddyprisen
2010: Lindemanprisen

Discography 
Solo albums
2001: Baritone Landscape (Gemini Records)
2005: Sval Draum (Taurus Records)

Collaborative albums
1979: Moments (Arctic Records), with Bjørn Alterhaug
1980: Snowdown (Bergland Production), with Gunnar Andreas Berg
1987: Sax Of A Kind (Hot Club Records), with Warne Marsh
1988: Blodig Alvor Na Na Na Na Na (CBS), with DumDum Boys
1989: Annbjørg (Kirkelig Kulturverksted), with Annbjørg Lien
1990: Blackbird (Sonor Records), with Siri's Svale Band
1991: Constellations (Odin Records), with Bjørn Alterhaug
1991: Sangen Vi Glemte (Idut), with Frode Fjellheim
1992: Nattjazz 20 År (Grappa Music), with various artists
1995: Steps Towards A Dream (Odin Records), with Lee Konitz
1995: Oofotr (Norske Gram), with Oofotr
1995: Monk Moods (Odin Records), with Knut Kristiansen
1996: Her Er Huset Som Per Bygde (Hot Club Records), with Jan Erik Vold
1996: Svarrabærje (Kirkelig Kulturverksted), with Henning Sommerro
1997: Vårsøg (Norske Gram), with Henning Sommerro
2004: Across  (Vossa Jazz Records), with Svein Folkvord
2005: We Are? (Jazzaway Records), with Eirik Hegdal & Trondheim Jazz Orchestra
2005: Live In Molde (MNJ Records), with Chick Corea & Trondheim Jazz Orchestra
2005: Tribute (MNJ Records), with Vigleik Storaas & Trondheim Jazz Orchestra
2007: Subtrio  (Vossa Jazz Records), with Subtrio
2007: Melancholy Delight (Resonant Music), with Espen Rud
2007: Live In Oslo (Ponca Jazz Records), with Lee Konitz
2007: Live At Sting (Dravle Records), with Subtrio feat. Paolo Fresu
2008: Tangos, Ballads & More (Park Grammofon), with Steinar Raknes
2008: Wood And Water (MNJ Records), with Eirik Hegdal & Trondheim Jazz Orchestra
2009: Songlines (Ponca Jazz Records), with Bjørn Alterhaug
2009: What If? A Counterfactual Fairytale (MNJ Records), with Erlend Skomsvoll & Trondheim Jazz Orchestra
2011: Dobbeldans (Curling Legs), with Espen Rud
2011: Fine Together (Inner Ear), with Roger Johansen feat. Georg Riedel
2012: Vegen Åt Deg (Øra Fonogram), with Heidi Skjerve
2012: Løvsamleren (Curling Legs), with Espen Rud
2014: Exit Sigurd Bjørhovde Groups. where Inderberg is heard on Tenor Saxophone in 3 recordings from 1974.
2019: Live in Oslo'' (Jazzland Recordings) with Baker Hansen

References

External links

1950 births
Living people
Musicians from Steinkjer
Norwegian jazz composers
Male jazz composers
Norwegian jazz saxophonists
Norwegian music educators
Ponca Jazz Records artists
21st-century saxophonists
21st-century Norwegian male musicians
Trondheim Jazz Orchestra members
Siri's Svale Band members
Bodega Band members
Jazzland Recordings (1997) artists